Heteroclinus wilsoni, or Wilson's weedfish, is a species of clinid found along the coast of southern Australia and Tasmania where it can be found in weedy reefs from the intertidal zone down to a depth of about .  This species can reach a maximum length of  TL. The specific name honours John Bracebridge Wilson (1828-1895), a naturalist and headmaster who collected the type.

References

wilsoni
Taxa named by Arthur Henry Shakespeare Lucas
Fish described in 1891